St. Anne's, Gladstone Avenue (in earlier documents, St Anne's, Brockton and popularly the Group of Seven Church) in Toronto is a National Historic Site and parish of the Anglican Church of Canada. It was established in 1863 as the parish for the hamlet of Brockton, Canada, and is one of the seven (formerly twelve) parishes of Parkdale Deanery. The current building, dating to 1907–08 and overlooking Dufferin Street, is noted for its distinctive design, based on the Byzantine Revival style. The interior of the church is decorated by artwork by members of the Group of Seven circle of painters, depicting events of the Old and New Testaments and dating to 1923. The artwork by J. E. H. MacDonald, Frederick Varley, and Franklin Carmichael is a unique example of Group of Seven art designed for a religious purpose, something they are not known for.

History
The first church was built in 1862, which now serves as the church's hall.  In 1906 Canon Lawrence Skey oversaw the building of a new church to better fit its increasing congregation.  In 1907 a competition was held for the design of the new church, and was won by William Ford Howland.  The church was built in the Byzantine Revival style.  St. Anne's is constructed of concrete and brick and has a cruciform plan with a distinctive central dome,  in height. Other architectural features include two domed bell towers, a half-domed chancel and arched transepts. It is the only Canadian Anglican church built in the Byzantine style.  The property is protected by an Ontario Heritage Trust conservation easement. The property is also a designated building under the Ontario Heritage Act and it was designated as a National Historic Site by the Government of Canada in 1996.

Group of Seven
In 1923 Canon Lawrence Skey commissioned artwork for the interior; the project was led by J. E. H. MacDonald, one of the founding members of the Group of Seven.  MacDonald assembled a group of Canadian artists, which included fellow Group of Seven members Fred Varley and Franklin Carmichael, as well as Thoreau MacDonald, Neil Mackechnie, Arthur Martin, S. Treviranus, H. S. Palmer and H. S. Stansfield.  Together they created more than a dozen murals and large paintings.  The group also included sculptors Frances Loring and Florence Wyle, who created medallions and the reliefs of the four apostles.

References

External links
St. Anne's Anglican Church at the Ontario Heritage Trust website
St Anne's on Lost Rivers.
Historical plaques of St Anne's Church
saintanne.ca Church Website

Anne
Anne
City of Toronto Heritage Properties
Ontario Heritage Trust
National Historic Sites in Ontario